Christophe Milhères (born 3 January 1972, in Bayonne), is a former French rugby union player. He played as a flanker.

Milhères played for Biarritz Olympique from 1997/98 to 2004/05, where he twice won the French Championship, in 2001/02 and 2004/05. He then moved to US Dax in 2005. He became coach of US Dax in 2007 after the nomination of Marc Lièvremont.

Honours 
 French rugby champion, 2002, 2005 with Biarritz Olympique

External links
 EspnScrum profile

1972 births
Living people
French rugby union players
Sportspeople from Bayonne
Biarritz Olympique players
France international rugby union players
Rugby union flankers
US Dax players
US Dax coaches